Kaji Man Samsohang is a Nepalese politician, belonging to the Communist Party of Nepal (Unified Marxist-Leninist). He contested the Taplejung-1 constituency in the 1994 legislative election, coming in second place with 9822 votes. He was defeated by Mani Lama.

References

Communist Party of Nepal (Unified Marxist–Leninist) politicians
Living people
Year of birth missing (living people)